The 1960 season was the Hawthorn Football Club's 36th season in the Victorian Football League and 59th overall.

Fixture

Night Series

Premiership Season

Ladder

References

Hawthorn Football Club seasons